The Montana Library Association is the state library association of Montana. It is run by librarians from across the state.

Their mission is, "to develop, promote, and improve library and information services and the profession of librarianship in order to enhance learning and ensure access to information for all." They grant library awards including the Sheila Cates Librarian of the Year and the Montana Library of the Year at their annual conference. According to the Montana State Library, the Association, "is a statewide professional organization dedicated to supporting libraries, trustees and library staff in Montana...Throughout the year MLA hosts retreats and an annual conference where members can meet and learn more about what is happening in libraries."

It is listed in the 2016-07-13 Senate Congressional Record, as well as other lists of State Library Associations.

See also
Alma Smith Jacobs
American Library Association
Bozeman Public Library
Missoula Public Library

References

External links

 Pacific Northwest Library Association

1906 establishments in Montana
Library-related organizations
State agencies of Montana
Public libraries in Montana